Athleta (Ternivoluta) studeri is a species of sea snail, a marine gastropod mollusk in the family Volutidae, the volutes.

There are two subspecies:
 Athleta (Ternivoluta) studeri studeri (Martens, 1897)
 Athleta (Ternivoluta) studeri swainensis Bail & limpus, 1998

Description
Shell elongately fusiform with a high gradate spire and rounded body whorl tapering gently to the anterior canal. Sutural groove narrow but forming a prominent shoulder on the adult whorls. No sutural nodules. Thin axial costae present only on the first whorl, absent from the succeeding whorls. Shoulder nodules developed on the costae and persisting to the adult whorls but irregularly developed and much reduced in size. Spiral lirae weakly developed and confined to the anterior portion of the body whorl. Four major and three or four minor plaits. Colour pattern of thin axial chestnut bands and three interrupted thicker spiral bands on the body whorl, one of which is also present on the spire.

Distribution
This marine species occurs off Eastern Australia.

References

 Bail, P & Poppe, G. T. 2001. A conchological iconography: a taxonomic introduction of the recent Volutidae. Hackenheim-Conchbook, 30 pp, 5 pl. (updated October 2008 for WoRMS)

Volutidae
Gastropods described in 1897